Maxwell and Tuke was an architectural practice in North West England.  It was founded in 1857 and continued to design works, mainly in the local area into the 20th century.  The partners were James Maxwell (1838–93), William Charles Tuke (1843–93), and Francis William Maxwell, James' second son (usually known as Frank) (1863–1941).  The practice originated in Bury (then in Lancashire, later in Greater Manchester) and moved its main office to Manchester in 1884.  The early designs by the practice were for relatively small buildings, such as shops and houses, and for larger ones such as churches.  In 1871 they won a competition for the design of Cambridge Hall, Southport.  More commissions followed, the most notable being for two large seaside towers: Blackpool Tower, followed by the larger New Brighton Tower, which has since been demolished.

Their work extended to Ireland. They won the competition to design the Reform Club, Royal Avenue, Belfast, 1883–85. The firm was placed second in the competition for the Belfast Central Library.

Key

Notable works

References
Citations

Sources

Maxwell and Tuke